{{DISPLAYTITLE:C18H13ClFN3}}
The molecular formula C18H13ClFN3 (molar mass: 325.767 g/mol, exact mass: 325.0782 u) may refer to:

 Basimglurant (RG-7090)
 Midazolam

Molecular formulas